Zvonko Brkić (18 September 1912 – 27 August 1977) was a Croatian politician who served as the president of the Executive Council of the People's Republic of Croatia, a constituent republic of the Yugoslavia, from 10 July 1962 to June 1963. He subsequently became Vice President of the Federal Assembly (1963–1967).

See also
Prime Minister of Croatia

References

Croatian politicians
Croatian communists
1912 births
1977 deaths
Recipients of the Order of the People's Hero